"Tippin' Point" is a song recorded by Canadian country and rock artist Dallas Smith for his debut extended play of the same name (2014). It was released October 8, 2013, as the lead single for his then-forthcoming second studio album, as well as his first single in the American market since signing with Republic Nashville. A critical and commercial success, "Tippin' Point" peaked in the top 40 on the Billboard Canadian Hot 100 and set a record for the fastest Canadian country single to reach Gold certification by selling over 40,000 units in 13 weeks; it has since been certified Platinum.

Background
In the fall of 2013, Smith signed to American label Republic Nashville and opened for country music duo Florida Georgia Line (also on Republic Nashville) on their "Here's to the Good Times" Tour. The song was written by Brian Kelley and Tyler Hubbard of Florida Georgia Line along with Jaren Johnston, and was produced by Joey Moi, who produced Smith's first solo album as well as Florida Georgia Line's Here's to the Good Times. In an interview with Digital Journal, Smith revealed the boys of Florida Georgia Line offered the song to him, and he wanted a chance to "put [his] own stamp on it." He also described the song to country music blog Roughstock as a "blend of what I love about country and rock," noting that "the song sums me up as an artist and is a great representation of where I'm going."

Music video
The music video was directed by Stephano Barberis and premiered in January 2014.

Chart performance

Certifications

References

2013 songs
2013 singles
Dallas Smith songs
Republic Nashville singles
Republic Records singles
Song recordings produced by Joey Moi
Music videos directed by Stephano Barberis
Songs written by Jaren Johnston
Songs written by Brian Kelley (musician)
Songs written by Tyler Hubbard